HD 76700 is a star in the southern constellation of Volans. It is yellow in hue and is too faint to be visible to the naked eye, having an apparent visual magnitude of 8.16. This object is located at a distance of 199 light years from the Sun based on stellar parallax. It is drifting further away with a radial velocity of +39 km/s.

Properties 
This object is a G-type main-sequence star with a stellar classification of G6V, which indicates it is generating energy through core hydrogen fusion. It is a metal-enriched star, showing a much higher metallicity than the Sun. This may be explained by prior accretion of refractory-rich planetary bodies into the stellar atmosphere. The mass of HD 76700 is very similar to (1.1 times) that of the Sun, but it is cooler and brighter (with an effective temperature of 5,694 K and luminosity of 1.69 Suns) and thus much older—around 6.9 billion years old.

Planetary 
HD 76700 is orbited by a giant planet that was discovered in 2003 via the radial velocity method. Designated , this planet is orbiting very close to the star with a period of just four days.

References

G-type main-sequence stars
Planetary systems with one confirmed planet
Volans (constellation)
Durchmusterung objects
076700
043686